Saint-Benoît is a commune in the French overseas department of Réunion. It is located on the eastern part of the island of Réunion, about 40 kilometres southeast of Saint-Denis, the capital.

Geography
It is the second largest city of the island by its surface area.
In the west of the commune lies Grand Étang, the largest lake of La Réunion. Close to the lake flows the Bras d'Annette waterfall.

Climate
Saint-Benoît has a tropical rainforest climate (Köppen climate classification Af). The climate is tropical, influenced by the wind called "alizés" or trade wind.

Population

See also
Communes of the Réunion department

References

Communes of Réunion
Subprefectures in France